"Pull Up N Wreck" is a song by American rapper Big Sean and American record producer Metro Boomin. It was released on November 3, 2017 as the lead single from their collaborative studio album Double or Nothing (2017). The song features Atlanta-based rapper 21 Savage and was produced by Metro Boomin and Southside.

Background
Big Sean and Metro Boomin teased the song on social media shortly before the release, without mentioning 21 Savage's feature and keeping it a surprise.

Composition
The song, described as "jumpy" and uptempo, finds Big Sean and 21 Savage rapping about "what they're capable of when they show up to the scene". It contains references to the video game GoldenEye 007, as well as a sample of a gunshot from the game.

Critical reception
The song received generally positive reviews. Kevin Goddard of HotNewHipHop gave the song a "Very Hot" rating and commented, "This shit hard!" Nicolaus Li of Hypebeast wrote, "'Pull Up N Wreck' features a simple hook and infectious beat". Likewise, Tom Breihan of Stereogum described the song as having a "truly sticky hook". In an otherwise negative review of Double or Nothing, Trent Clark wrote, "With the exception of the 21 Savage-featuring 'Pull Up N Wreck,' which packs a massive beat, none of the records indicate there's enough chemistry between the two All-Star artists to deserve a full-length offering."

Contrarily, Vince Rick of HotNewHipHop wrote that the song "belongs more to 21 Savage than to Sean, and highlights the incompatibility between artist and producer."

Charts

References

2017 singles
2017 songs
Big Sean songs
Metro Boomin songs
21 Savage songs
Songs written by Big Sean
Songs written by Metro Boomin
Songs written by 21 Savage
Songs written by Southside (record producer)
Song recordings produced by Metro Boomin
Song recordings produced by Southside (record producer)
GOOD Music singles
Def Jam Recordings singles
Republic Records singles
Universal Music Group singles